William VIII ( – 25 September 1086), born Guy-Geoffrey (Gui-Geoffroi), was duke of Gascony (1052–1086), and then duke of Aquitaine and count of Poitiers (as William VI) between 1058 and 1086, succeeding his brother William VII (Pierre-Guillaume).

Life
Guy-Geoffroy was the youngest son of William V of Aquitaine by his third wife Agnes of Burgundy. He was the brother-in-law of Henry III, Holy Roman Emperor who had married his sister, Agnes de Poitou.

He became Duke of Gascony in 1052 during his older brother William VII's rule. Gascony had come to Aquitanian rule through William V's marriage to Prisca (a.k.a. Brisce) of Gascony, the sister of Duke Sans VI Guilhem of Gascony.

William VIII was one of the leaders of the allied army called to help Ramiro I of Aragon in the Siege of Barbastro (1064). This expedition was the first campaign organized by the papacy, namely Pope Alexander II, against a Muslim town and stronghold in the Emirate of Zaragoza, and the precursor of the later Crusades movement. Aragon and its allies conquered the city, killed and enslaved its inhabitants and collected an important booty.

However, Aragon lost the city again in the following years. During William VIII's rule, the alliance with the southern kingdoms of modern Spain was a political priority as shown by the marriage of all his daughters to Iberian kings.

Marriage and children
William married three times and had at least five children. After he divorced his first two wives, the first due to infertility, he married a third time to a much younger woman who was also his cousin Robert I of Burgundy's daughter. This marriage produced a son, but William VIII had to visit Rome in the early 1070s to persuade the pope to recognize his children from his third marriage as legitimate.

First wife:  of Périgord, daughter of Count Aldabert II of Périgord (divorced November 1058), no children. She became a nun at Saintes.
Second wife: Matoeda (divorced May 1068)
 Agnes, married Alfonso VI of Castile
Third wife: Hildegarde of Burgundy (daughter of duke Robert I of Burgundy)
Agnes (died 1097), married Peter I of Aragon
William IX of Aquitaine, his heir

Notes

References

Sources

See also
Dukes of Aquitaine family tree

|-

|-

House of Poitiers
William 08 of Aquitaine
Dukes of Gascony
William 08 of Aquitaine
William 08 of Aquitaine